João Dickson Carvalho (born 1952) is a Brazilian former football player.

Career
Carvalho was one of several foreign players in the Japan Soccer League, and during the 1977 season, he became the first foreign player to win the top scorer in the Japan Soccer League First Division. Carvalho scored a total of 77 goals in the league becoming the fourth all-time top scorer in the Japan Soccer League First Division history.

Personal honors
Japanese Footballer of the Year - 1 (1977)
Japan Soccer League First Division Top Scorer - 2 (1977 (on his own), 1978 (shared with Kunishige Kamamoto))
Japan Soccer League First Division Best Eleven - 5 (1977, 1978, 1979, 1980, 1981)

References

1952 births
Living people
Brazilian footballers
Brazilian expatriate footballers
Guarani FC players
Fluminense FC players
Expatriate footballers in Japan
Japan Soccer League players
Shonan Bellmare players
Yokohama Flügels players
Association football forwards
Footballers from São Paulo